The 46th International Film Festival of India was held on 20 to 30 November 2015 in Goa. The International Jury was headed by the chairperson, Shekhar Kapur along with UK based director, Micheal Radford, Palestinian based Israel director, Ms. Suha Arraf, German Actress, Julia Jentsch and South Korean filmmaker Jeon Kyu-Hwan. The 13-member Feature Jury was headed by Chairperson, Aribam Syam Sharma, while the 7-member Non-Feature jury was led by Chairperson, Rajendra Janglay.

Winners
Golden Peacock (Best Film): Embrace of the Serpent by Ciro Guerra
IFFI Best Director Award:  Peter Greenaway for "Eisenstein in Guanajuato" 
IFFI Best Actor Award (Male): Silver Peacock Award: Vincent Lindon for "The Measure of a Man"
IFFI Best Actor Award (Female): Silver Peacock Award:  Gunes Sensoy, Doga Doguslu, Tugba Sunguroglu, Elit İşcan and İlayda Akdoğan for "Mustang" 
Silver Peacock Special Jury Award: Sealed Cargo by Julia Vargas-Weise
Special Mention: for "Enclave" by Goran Radovaovic

Special Awards

IFFI ICFT UNESCO Gandhi Medal: Kaushik Ganguly for Cinemawala
Life Time Achievement Award -  Nikita Mikhalkov, Oscar-winning Russian actor-filmmaker
IFFI Indian Film Personality of the Year Award:  Ilaiyaraaja

Official selections

Special screenings

Opening film
"The Man Who Knew Infinity"

Closing film
"The Clan"

References

External links
 

2015 film festivals
2015 festivals in Asia
International Film Festival of India
2015 in Indian cinema